Black Jesus Experience are a nine piece Ethio-jazz band based in Melbourne, Australia. Since 2009 they have been best known for collaborations with Mulatu Astatke as well as a growing discography of independent work. Black Jesus Experience blend traditional Ethiopian music with hip-hop and funk.

In June 2009 they appeared on a segment of Sunday Arts, which was broadcast nationally by ABC-TV. They are winners of The Ages "Best Tour 2010" award for their Australian tour with Astatke.

Black Jesus Experience have played numerous festivals including Glastonbury Festival, Big Chill, City of London Festival, WOMADelaide, The Big Day Out and Melbourne Jazz Festival, supported Tony Allen and toured Europe and Ethiopia.

Their fourth album, Migration. received the 'Best Global/Reggae album' accolade at The Ages 2014 Music Victoria awards.

In 2016, Black Jesus Experience released their fifth studio album, Cradle of Humanity, a collaboration with Mulatu Astatke, followed by an Australian and New Zealand tour including the 2016 Melbourne Jazz Festival.

On July 3, 2020 Black Jesus Experience released their second collaborative album with Mulatu Astatke entitled To Know Without Knowing following a 2019 Australian tour. The album received critical acclaim, vocals by Taye were hailed 'mesmerising' and the album deemed an 'irresistible collective effort'.

Black Jesus Experience currently hold a weekly residence at Melbourne's The Horn African Cafe and Restaurant performing their catalogue each Sunday as well as holding regular live concerts across Melbourne.

Discography

Studio albums

Awards and nominations

Music Victoria Awards
The Music Victoria Awards, are an annual awards night celebrating Victorian music. They commenced in 2005.

! 
|-
| rowspan="2"| 2014
| rowspan="2"| Migration
| Best Global or Reggae Album
| 
| 
|-
| Best Jazz Album
| 
| rowspan="2"| 
|-
| 2016
| Cradle of Humanity
| Best Global or Reggae Album
| 
|-
| 2020
| Black Jesus Experience
| Best Intercultural Act
| 
| 
|-
| 2021
| Black Jesus Experience
| Best Intercultural Act
| 
| 
|-
| 2022
| Black Jesus Experience
| MAV Diasporas Award
| 
| 
|-

References 

Australian jazz ensembles
Musical groups established in 2009
Musical groups from Melbourne